The CMLL Universal Championship (2017) was a professional wrestling tournament produced and scripted by Consejo Mundial de Lucha Libre (CMLL; "World Wrestling Council"). The tournament started on June 30, 2017 and ran for three Super Viernes shows with the finals taking place on July 14, 2017 at Arena México in Mexico City, Mexico. The CMLL Universal Championship is an annual tournament exclusively for wrestlers who hold a CMLL-recognized championship at the time of the tournament. The tournament was first held in 2009, making the 2017 version the ninth overall tournament. Being a professional wrestling tournament, it is not won legitimately; it is instead won via predetermined outcomes to the matches that is kept secret from the general public.

The finals saw NWA World Historic Welterweight Champion Volador Jr. defeat NWA World Historic Middleweight Champion Último Guerrero to win the tournament for the first time. On the Universal Championship finals show Pierroth defeated Vangellys in a Lucha de Apuestas match, forcing Vangellys to have his hair shaved off. Atlantis was originally scheduled to participate in the match but was injured in the weeks leading up to the tournament. Atlantis was replaced by Diamante Azul, who held the Occidente Heavyweight Championship at the time, although he had not defended it since 2014.

Background
The tournament featured 15 professional wrestling matches under single-elimination tournament rules, which means that wrestlers would be eliminated from the tournament when they lose a match. All male "non-regional" CMLL champions at the time of the tournament were eligible to participate in the tournament. The CMLL World Mini-Estrella Championship and Mexican National Lightweight Championship are both exclusively for CMLL's Mini-Estrella division and thus not eligible for the tournament. Regionally promoted championships such as the CMLL Arena Coliseo Tag Team Championship and the Occidente championships promoted in Guadalajara, Jalisco have not been included in the tournament in the past; only titles that have been defended in CMLL's main venue Arena Mexico, although exceptions have been made to allow New Japan Pro-Wrestling (NJPW) champions to compete if they were in Mexico at the time. Reigning Mexican National Light Heavyweight Champion was originally scheduled to participate in the Universal Championship tournament, but suffered a serious knee injury prior to the tournament and had to undergo surgery. CMLL replaced Atlantis with Diamante Azul, who held the Occidente Heavyweight Championship, although he had not defended it since 2015. This marked the first time an Occidente champion participated in the Universal Championship tournament.

For the 2017 version of the tournament 14 out of the 16 participants had competed in at least one Universal Championship tournament before. Soberano Jr. had won the Mexican National Welterweight Championship from Rey Cometa on May 13, 2017 to qualify for his first Universal Championship tournament. Hechicero was the other first-time competitor, having won the NWA World Light Heavyweight Championship from Rey Bucanero, winning his first CMLL championship.

Eligible champions

Tournament

Tournament shows
Super Viernes June 30, 2017

Super Viernes July 7, 2017

Super Viernes July 14, 2017

References

2017 in professional wrestling
CMLL Universal Championship